A toll road, also known as a turnpike or tollway, is a public or private road (almost always a controlled-access highway in the present day) for which a fee (or toll) is assessed for passage. It is a form of road pricing typically implemented to help recoup the costs of road construction and maintenance.

Toll roads have existed in some form since antiquity, with tolls levied on passing travelers on foot, wagon, or horseback; a practice that continued with the automobile, and many modern tollways charge fees for motor vehicles exclusively. The amount of the toll usually varies by vehicle type, weight, or number of axles, with freight trucks often charged higher rates than cars.
 
Tolls are often collected at toll plazas, toll booths, toll houses, toll stations, toll bars, toll barriers, or toll gates. Some toll collection points are automatic, and the user deposits money in a machine which opens the gate once the correct toll has been paid. To cut costs and minimise time delay, many tolls are collected with electronic toll collection equipment which automatically communicates with a toll payer's transponder or uses automatic number-plate recognition to charge drivers by debiting their accounts.

Criticisms of toll roads include the time taken to stop and pay the toll, and the cost of the toll booth operators—up to about one-third of revenue in some cases. Automated toll-paying systems help minimise both of these. Others object to paying "twice" for the same road: in fuel taxes and in tolls.

In addition to toll roads, toll bridges and toll tunnels are also used by public authorities to generate funds to repay the cost of building the structures. Some tolls are set aside to pay for future maintenance or enhancement of infrastructure, or are applied as a general fund by local governments, not being earmarked for transport facilities. This is sometimes limited or prohibited by central government legislation. Also, road congestion pricing schemes have been implemented in a limited number of urban areas as a transportation demand management tool to try to reduce traffic congestion and air pollution.

History

Ancient times
Toll roads have existed for at least the last 2,700 years, as tolls had to be paid by travellers using the Susa–Babylon highway under the regime of Ashurbanipal, who reigned in the seventh century BC.

Aristotle and Pliny refer to tolls in Arabia and other parts of Asia. In India, before the fourth century BC, the Arthashastra notes the use of tolls. Germanic tribes charged tolls to travellers across mountain passes.

Middle Ages

Most roads were not freely open to travel on in Europe during the Middle Ages, and the toll was one of many feudal fees paid for rights of usage in everyday life. Some major European "highways", such as the Via Regia and Via Imperii, offered protection to travelers in exchange for paying the royal toll.

Many modern European roads were originally constructed as toll roads in order to recoup the costs of construction and maintenance, and to generate revenue from passing travelers. In 14th-century England, some of the most heavily used roads were repaired with money raised from tolls by pavage grants. Widespread toll roads sometimes restricted traffic so much, by their high tolls, that they interfered with trade and cheap transportation needed to alleviate local famines or shortages.

Tolls were used in the Holy Roman Empire in the 14th and 15th centuries.

17th-century Dahomey
After significant road construction undertaken by the West African kingdom of Dahomey, toll booths were also established with the function of collecting yearly taxes based on the goods carried by the people of Dahomey and their occupation. In some cases, officials imposed fines for public nuisance before allowing people to pass.

19th century
Industrialisation in Europe needed major improvements to the transport infrastructure which included many new or substantially improved roads, financed from tolls. The A5 road in Britain was built to provide a robust transport link between Britain and Ireland and had a toll house every few miles.

20th century
In the 20th century, road tolls were introduced in Europe to finance the construction of motorway networks and specific transport infrastructure such as bridges and tunnels. Italy was the first European country to charge motorway tolls, on a  motorway section near Milan in 1924. It was followed by Greece, which made users pay for the network of motorways around and between its cities in 1927. Later in the 1950s and 1960s, France, Spain, and Portugal started to build motorways largely with the aid of concessions, allowing rapid development of this infrastructure without massive state debts. Since then, road tolls have been introduced in the majority of the EU member states.

In the United States, prior to the introduction of the Interstate Highway System and the large federal grants supplied to states to build it, many states constructed their first controlled-access highways by floating bonds backed by toll revenues. Starting with the Pennsylvania Turnpike in 1940, and followed by similar roads in New Jersey (New Jersey Turnpike, 1952 and Garden State Parkway, 1954), New York (New York State Thruway, 1954), Massachusetts (Massachusetts Turnpike, 1957), Illinois (Illinois Tollway, 1958), and others, numerous states throughout the 1950s established major toll roads. With the establishment of the Interstate Highway System in the late 1950s, toll road construction in the U.S. slowed down considerably, as the federal government now provided the bulk of funding to construct new freeways, and regulations required that such Interstate highways be free from tolls. Many older toll roads were added to the Interstate System under a grandfather clause that allowed tolls to continue to be collected on toll roads that predated the system. Some of these such as the Connecticut Turnpike and the Richmond–Petersburg Turnpike later removed their tolls when the initial bonds were paid off. Many states, however, have maintained the tolling of these roads as a consistent source of revenue.

As the Interstate Highway System approached completion during the 1980s, states began constructing toll roads again to provide new controlled-access highways which were not part of the original interstate system funding. Houston's outer beltway of interconnected toll roads began in 1983, and many states followed over the last two decades of the 20th century adding new toll roads, including the tollway system around Orlando, Florida, Colorado's E-470, and Georgia State Route 400.

21st century
London, in an effort to reduce traffic within the city, instituted the London congestion charge in 2003, effectively making all roads within the centre of the city tolled.

In the United States, as states looked for ways to construct new freeways without federal funding again, to raise revenue for continued road maintenance, and to control congestion, new toll road construction saw significant increases during the first two decades of the 21st century. Spurred on by two innovations, the electronic toll collection system, and the advent of high-occupancy and express lane tolls, many areas of the U.S saw large road building projects in major urban areas. Electronic toll collection, first introduced in the 1980s, reduces operating costs by removing toll collectors from roads. Tolled express lanes, by which certain lanes of a freeway are designated "toll only", increases revenue by allowing a free-to-use highway to collect revenue by allowing drivers to bypass traffic jams by paying a toll.

The E-ZPass system, compatible with many state systems, is the largest ETC system in the U.S., and is used for both fully tolled highways and tolled express lanes. Maryland Route 200 and the Triangle Expressway in North Carolina were the first toll roads built without toll booths, with drivers charged via ETC or by optical license plate recognition and are billed by mail.  In addition, many older toll roads are also being upgraded to an all-electronic tolling system, abandoning the hybrid systems they adopted during the late 20th century.  These include the Massachusetts Turnpike, one of the oldest American toll roads, which went all-electronic in 2016, and the Pennsylvania Turnpike, America's oldest toll freeway, which went all-electronic in 2020.

United Kingdom turnpikes

Turnpike trusts were established in England and Wales from about 1706 in response to the need for better roads than the few and poorly-maintained tracks then available. Turnpike trusts were set up by individual Acts of Parliament, with powers to collect road tolls to repay loans for building, improving, and maintaining the principal roads in Britain.

The trusts were ultimately responsible for the maintenance and improvement of most of the main roads in England and Wales, which were used to distribute agricultural and industrial goods economically. The tolls were a source of revenue for road building and maintenance, paid for by road users and not from general taxation. The turnpike trusts were gradually abolished from the 1870s. Most trusts improved existing roads, but some new roads, usually only short stretches, were also built. Thomas Telford's Holyhead road followed Watling Street from London but was exceptional in creating a largely new route beyond Shrewsbury, and especially beyond Llangollen. Built in the early 19th century, with many toll booths along its length, most of it is now the A5. In the modern day, one major toll road is the M6 Toll, relieving traffic congestion on the M6 in Birmingham. A few notable bridges and tunnels continue as toll roads including the Dartford Crossing  and Mersey Gateway bridge.

Toll roads elsewhere
Some cities in Canada had toll roads in the 19th century. Roads radiating from Toronto required users to pay at toll gates along the street (Yonge Street, Bloor Street, Davenport Road, Kingston Road) and disappeared after 1895.

19th-century plank roads were usually operated as toll roads. One of the first U.S. motor roads, the Long Island Motor Parkway (which opened on October 10, 1908) was built by William Kissam Vanderbilt II, the great-grandson of Cornelius Vanderbilt. The road was closed in 1938 when it was taken over by the state of New York in lieu of back taxes.

Toll roads in Russia 
The first toll road in St. Petersburg appeared in the 2000s. The Western High-Speed Diameter (WHSD) is a multilane motorway running from the South to the North. The road connects the southwest of the city, including the Sea Port area, with the Ring Road, Vasilievsky Island, Kurortny district and the Scandinavia motorway. The WHSD is divided into three sections: Southern, Central and Northern. The entire stretch of the WHSD was opened for traffic in 2016.

There are 16 toll plazas on the WHSD. Paying toll by transponder is mostly recommended for frequent drivers. The Flow+ toll collection system was implemented on the WHSD. The system was designed for automatic calculation of the driving distance of a vehicle equipped with a transponder. The system does not require constructing toll plazas at each entrance to or exit from the highway. Transponders mounted on vehicles are read by signal receivers installed at the entrance and exit ramps.

Charging methods 

Road tolls were levied traditionally for a specific access (e.g. city) or for a specific infrastructure (e.g. roads, bridges). These concepts were widely used until the last century. However, the evolution in technology made it possible to implement road tolling policies based on different concepts. The different charging concepts are designed to suit different requirements regarding purpose of the charge, charging policy, the network to the charge, tariff class differentiation, et cetera:

 Time-based charges and access fees: In a time-based charging regime, a road user has to pay for a given period of time in which they may use the associated infrastructure. For the practically identical access fees, the user pays for the access to a restricted zone for a period or several days.
 Motorway and other infrastructure tolling: The term tolling is used for charging a well-defined special and comparatively costly infrastructure, like a bridge, a tunnel, a mountain pass, a motorway concession, or the whole motorway network of a country. Classically a toll is due when a vehicle passes a tolling station, be it a manual barrier-controlled toll plaza or a free-flow multi-lane station.
 Distance or area charging: In a distance or area charging system concept, vehicles are charged per total distance driven in a defined area.

Some toll roads charge a toll in only one direction. Examples include the Sydney Harbour Bridge, Sydney Harbour Tunnel, and Eastern Distributor (these all charge tolls city-bound) in Australia, in the United States, crossings between Pennsylvania and New Jersey operated by Delaware River Port Authority and crossings between New Jersey and New York operated by Port Authority of New York and New Jersey. This technique is practical where the detour to avoid the toll is large or the toll differences are small.

Collection methods

Traditionally, tolls were paid by hand at a toll gate. Although payments may still be made in cash, it is more common now to pay using an electronic toll collection system. In some places, payment is made using transponders which are affixed to the windscreen.

Three systems of toll roads exist: open (with mainline barrier toll plazas); closed (with entry/exit tolls); and open road (no toll booths, only electronic toll collection gantries at entrances and exits or at strategic locations on the median of the road). Some toll roads use a combination of the three systems.

On an open toll system, all vehicles stop at various locations along the highway to pay a toll. (This is different from "open road tolling", where no vehicles stop to pay a toll.)  While this may save money from the lack of need to construct toll booths at every exit, it can cause traffic congestion while traffic queues at the mainline toll plazas (toll barriers). It is also possible for motorists to enter an 'open toll road' after one toll barrier and exit before the next one, thus travelling on the toll road toll-free. Most open toll roads have ramp tolls or partial access junctions to prevent this practice, known in the U.S. as "shunpiking".

With a closed toll system, vehicles collect a ticket when entering the highway. In some cases, the ticket displays the toll to be paid on exit. Upon exit, the driver must pay the amount listed for the given exit. Should the ticket be lost, a driver must typically pay the maximum amount possible for travel on that highway. Short toll roads with no intermediate entries or exits may have only one toll plaza at one end, with motorists travelling in either direction paying a flat fee either when they enter or when they exit the toll road. In a variant of the closed toll system, mainline barriers are present at the two endpoints of the toll road, and each interchange has a ramp toll that is paid upon exit or entry. In this case, a motorist pays a flat fee at the ramp toll and another flat fee at the end of the toll road; no ticket is necessary. In addition, with most systems, motorists may pay tolls only with cash or change; debit and credit cards are not accepted. However, some toll roads may have travel plazas with ATMs so motorists can stop and withdraw cash for the tolls.

The toll is calculated by the distance travelled on the toll road or the specific exit chosen. In the United States, for instance, the Kansas Turnpike, Ohio Turnpike, New Jersey Turnpike, most of the Indiana Toll Road, New York State Thruway, and Florida's Turnpike currently implement closed systems.

The Union Toll Plaza on the Garden State Parkway was the first ever to use an automated toll collection machine. A plaque commemorating the event includes the first quarter collected at its toll booths.

The first major deployment of an RFID electronic toll collection system in the United States was on the Dallas North Tollway in 1989 by Amtech (see TollTag). The Amtech RFID technology used on the Dallas North Tollway was originally developed at Sandia Labs for use in tagging and tracking livestock. In the same year, the Telepass active transponder RFID system was introduced across Italy. Several US states now use mobile tolling platforms to facilitate use of payment via smartphones.

Highway 407 in the province of Ontario, Canada, has no toll booths, and instead reads a transponder mounted on the windshields of each vehicle using the road (the rear licence plates of vehicles lacking a transponder are photographed when they enter and exit the highway). This made the highway the first all-automated toll highway in the world. A bill is mailed monthly for usage of the 407. Lower charges are levied on frequent 407 users who carry electronic transponders in their vehicles. The approach has not been without controversy: In 2003 the 407 ETR settled a class action with a refund to users.

Throughout most of the East Coast of the United States, E-ZPass (operated under the brand I-Pass in Illinois) is accepted on almost all toll roads. Similar systems include SunPass in Florida, FasTrak in California, Good to Go in Washington state, and ExpressToll in Colorado. The systems use a small radio transponder mounted in or on a customer's vehicle to deduct toll fares from a pre-paid account as the vehicle passes through the toll barrier. This reduces manpower at toll booths and increases traffic flow and fuel efficiency by reducing the need for complete stops to pay tolls at these locations.

By designing a toll gate specifically for electronic collection, it is possible to carry out open-road tolling, where the customer does not need to slow at all when passing through the toll gate. The U.S. state of Texas is using a system that has no toll booths. Drivers without a TollTag have their license plate photographed automatically and the registered owner will receive a monthly bill, at a higher rate than those vehicles with TollTags. A similar variation of automatic collection is the Toll Roads in Orange County, CA, US, wherein all entry or collection points are equipped with high-speed cameras which read license plates and users will have 7 calendar days to pay online using their plate number or else set up an account for automatic debits.

The first all-electronic toll road in the northeastern United States, the InterCounty Connector (Maryland Route 200) was partially opened to traffic in February 2011, and the final segment was completed in November 2014.  The first section of another all-electronic toll road, the Triangle Expressway, opened at the beginning of 2012 in North Carolina.

Financing and management
Some toll roads are managed under such systems as the Build-Operate-Transfer (BOT) system. Private companies build the roads and are given a limited franchise. Ownership is transferred to the government when the franchise expires. This type of arrangement is prevalent in Australia, Canada, Hong Kong, Indonesia, India, South Korea, Japan, and the Philippines. The BOT system is a fairly new concept that is gaining ground in the United States, with California, Delaware, Florida, Illinois, Indiana, Mississippi, Texas, and Virginia already building and operating toll roads under this scheme. Pennsylvania, Massachusetts, New Jersey, and Tennessee are also considering the BOT methodology for future highway projects.

The more traditional means of managing toll roads in the United States is through semi-autonomous public authorities. Kansas, Maryland, Massachusetts, New Hampshire, New Jersey, New York, North Carolina, Ohio, Oklahoma, Pennsylvania, and West Virginia manage their toll roads in this manner. While most of the toll roads in California, Delaware, Florida, Texas, and Virginia are operating under the BOT arrangement, a few of the older toll roads in these states are still operated by public authorities.

In France, some toll roads are operated by private or public companies, with specific taxes collected by the state.

Arguments against toll roads 
Toll roads have been criticised as being inefficient in various ways:
 They require vehicles to stop or slow down (except open road tolling); manual toll collection wastes time and raises vehicle operating costs.
 Collection costs can reduce revenue by up to a third, and revenue theft is considered to be comparatively easy.
 Where the tolled roads are less congested than the parallel "free" roads, the traffic diversion resulting from the tolls increases congestion on the road system and reduces its usefulness.
 There are concerns about government surveillance associated with both electronic tolls and some forms of "classical" toll collection

A number of additional criticisms are also directed at toll roads in general:
 Toll roads are a form of regressive taxation; that is, compared to conventional taxes for funding roads, they benefit wealthier citizens more than poor citizens.
 If toll roads are owned or managed by private for profit entities, the citizens may lose money overall compared to conventional public funding because the private owners or operators of the toll system will naturally seek to profit from the roads.
 The managing entities, whether public or private, may not correctly account for the overall social costs, particularly to the poor, when setting pricing and thus may hurt the neediest segments of society.

Arguments in favor of toll roads
 Tolls help internalize some of the externalities of automobiles, that is costs automobile traffic imposes on society that aren't borne by users
 Through dynamic pricing trips that do not have to occur at rush hour can be moved to other times of the day or be avoided altogether. This makes more efficient use of existing road capacity.
 As richer people on average own more cars and drive more  using public funds especially those derived from regressive taxes like sales taxes represents wealth redistribution from poor households to rich ones. In the case of toll roads, those who drive more (overwhelmingly richer people) pay more and those who don't drive don't pay for road construction or maintenance

See also 
 List of toll roads
 Automobile costs
 Barrier toll system
 High-occupancy toll lane
 Private highway
 Shadow toll
 Shunpiking, the practice of avoiding turnpikes
 Toll house
 Toll roads around the world
 Turnpike trusts – England and Wales
 Freeway

References

External links 

 Turnpike Info
 Toll Tickets Official Website
International Bridge, Tunnel and Turnpike Association The International Bridge, Tunnel and Turnpike Association (IBTTA) is the worldwide alliance of toll operators and associated industries that provides a forum for sharing knowledge and ideas to promote and enhance toll-financed transportation services.
Toll Roads News from contractor perspective
Turnpike Roads in England and Wales, for background on toll roads during the turnpike era in England

Toll roads
Road infrastructure
Types of roads
Roads